Erika Schiller was a West German luger who competed during the early 1950s. She won the silver medal in the women's singles event at the 1952 European championships in Garmisch-Partenkirchen, West Germany.

References
List of European luge champions 

German female lugers
Possibly living people
Year of birth missing